Microtia is a monophyletic genus of butterflies from southern United States and Central America in the family Nymphalidae. It contains the single species Microtia elva, the elf.  Larvae of this species feed on Tetramerium and other species in the family Acanthaceae.

Subspecies
M. e. elva (Guatemala, Nicaragua)
M. e. horni Rebel, 1906 (Mexico, Oaxaca)

References

Melitaeini
Monotypic butterfly genera
Taxa named by Henry Walter Bates